Immigration and Naturalization Service v. St. Cyr, 533 U.S. 289 (2001), is a United States Supreme Court case involving habeas corpus and INA § 212(c) relief (repealed 1997) for deportable aliens.

Facts 
Enrico St. Cyr, a Haitian citizen, had been a lawful permanent resident (LPR) of the United States for ten years when he plead guilty to a controlled substance violation in Connecticut. Under the Immigration and Nationality Act (INA), St. Cyr became "removable" after he was convicted of a controlled substance violation. Before the Antiterrorism and Effective Death Penalty Act of 1996 (AEDPA) and the Illegal Immigration Reform and Immigrant Responsibility Act of 1996 (IIRIRA), INA § 212(c) was interpreted to give the U.S. Attorney General broad discretion to waive deportation of certain LPRs. The AEDPA and IIRIRA, however, limited relief to LPRs and non-LPRs. U.S. Attorney General John Ashcroft argued that AEDPA and IIRIRA stripped him of the authority to grant St. Cyr any waiver. St. Cyr, who had pleaded guilty on March 8, 1996, which was prior to the enactment of AEDPA and IIRIRA, had removal proceedings brought against him on April 10, 1997, after the enactment of these Acts, conceded removability but argued that he was entitled to a writ of habeas corpus. The U.S. District for the District of Connecticut accepted St. Cyr's habeas corpus application and agreed that the new restrictions do not apply to removal proceedings brought against an LPR who pleaded guilty to a deportable crime before the enactment of AEDPA and IIRIRA. The U.S. Court of Appeals for the Second Circuit affirmed.

Issues 
The Supreme Court answered two questions. The first one was procedural. Do the AEDPA and IIRIRA strip federal district courts of habeas corpus jurisdiction over deportable aliens as previously granted under ? The substantive question was whether the federal laws deny relief under INA § 212(c) to LPRs who would have been eligible for such relief at the time of their convictions?

Decision 
In a 5-4 opinion, Justice John Paul Stevens wrote for the majority stating that Congress did not intend to strip the federal district courts of their authority to hear habeas petitions from deportable aliens, and that the AEDPA and IIRIRA did not deny relief under INA § 212(c) to LPRs who would have been eligible for such relief at the time of their convictions. Stevens reasoned that the Supreme Court should interpret statutes as avoiding constitutional issues, such as abridging the right to habeas corpus. He also argued that there is a presumption that administrative proceedings can be appealed to Article III federal courts.

Dissent 
Justice Antonin Scalia dissented, arguing that the plain language of the AEDPA and IIRIRA stripped the federal district courts of jurisdiction to entertain habeas corpus petitions. He also argued that the majority was forcing Congress to use "magic words" to overcome the presumption of habeas corpus relief.

See also
List of United States Supreme Court cases, volume 533
List of United States Supreme Court cases

References

External links
 
 I-191, Application for Relief Under Former Section 212(c) of the Immigration and Nationality Act (INA)

United States Constitution Article One case law
United States Supreme Court cases
United States Supreme Court cases of the Rehnquist Court
United States immigration and naturalization case law
Suspension Clause case law
2001 in United States case law
Deportation from the United States
Haiti–United States relations